The women's trials is an event at the annual UCI Urban Cycling World Championships. It has been a UCI World Championships event since 2001.

From 2000 to 2016, the world championships trials were held alongside other mountain-biking disciplines as the UCI Mountain Bike & Trials World Championships. Beginning in 2017, the UCI World Championships trials are being run as part of the UCI Urban Cycling World Championships.

Medalists

Medal table

References

Results from the Union Cycliste Internationale's website.

Events at the UCI Mountain Bike & Trials World Championships